Collide is the Third studio album by the Milwaukee-based rock band The Gufs.

Track listing
All tracks by The Gufs

"Smile"
"Lost Along The Way"
"Belong"
"Crash (Into Me)"
"Out Somehow"
"Wasting Time"
"Someday Daughter"
"Waiting"
"Listen To The Trees"
"Emily"
"Loser's Love Song"
"Fear Me Now"

Personnel 

 Goran Kralj - lead vocals
 Dejan Kralj - bass guitar
 Morgan Dawley - lead guitar, backup vocals
 Scott Schwebel - drums
 Brian Pettit - percussion

External links
The Gufs Official Website

Notes

1990 albums
The Gufs albums